Davorin is a masculine given name. Notable people with the name include:

Davorin Dolar (1921–2005), Slovene chemist
Davorin Jenko (1835–1914), Slovene composer
Davorin Kablar (born 1977), Slovene footballer
Davorin Karničar (born 1962), Slovene alpinist and extreme skier
Davorin Popović (1946–2001), Bosnian pop singer
Davorin Trstenjak (1817–1890), Slovene writer, historian and priest

See also
Davorin (award), Bosnian music award now known as Indexi
Davor (name)

Slavic masculine given names
Slovene masculine given names